The following is a list of the 88 municipalities (comuni) of the Province of Oristano, Sardinia, Italy.

List

See also 
List of municipalities of Italy

References 

Oristano